Trichromia onytes is a species of moth from the family Erebidae first described by Pieter Cramer in 1777. It is found in Suriname, Brazil, Bolivia, Peru and Panama.

References

External links
 Image.

onytes
Moths of Central America
Moths described in 1777
Arctiinae of South America